The Housing of the Working Classes Act 1890 (53 & 54 Vict. c. 70) was an Act of the Parliament of the United Kingdom.

Background
The Housing of the Working Classes Act 1885 was a public health act, not a housing act. It empowered local authorities to condemn slum housing, but could not purchase the land and finance new housing. This act did that.

The Act
The act is made up of four parts and seven schedules:
 Part 1: Unhealthy Areas
 Part 2: Unhealthy Dwellings
 Part 3: Working Class Lodging Houses
 Part 4: Supplemental
 First Schedule: A list of the names of relevant authorities
 Second Schedule: Provisions for compulsory purchase
 Third Schedule: Provisions for closing premises
 Fourth and Fifth Schedule: A collection of forms to be used in applying the act
 Sixth Schedule: Lists required byelaws that authorities need to enact.

Implications
This gave London County Council the legal power to compulsory buy land out of area and to construct tenements and housing estates.
The powers under part 3 were extensive:
allowing the Council to: 
(a) lease land for the erection thereon of workmen's dwellings
(b) itself undertake the erection of dwellings or the improvement or reconstruction of existing dwellings
(c) fit up, furnish and maintain lodging working classes
(d) make any necessary by-laws and regulations for the management and use of the lodging houses
(e) sell dwellings or lodging houses established for seven years or upwards under Part III. of the Act whenever such dwellings or lodging houses are deemed by the Council and the Local Government Board to be unnecessary or too expensive to keep up.

The Housing of the Working Classes Act 1894 amended the financial provisions of part 2 of the principal Act.

The Housing of the Working Classes Act 1900 extended these powers to all authorities other than rural district councils.

See also
Boundary Estate

References

Further reading

External links
Guide to the reports of the Royal Commission on the Housing of the Working Classes.

United Kingdom Acts of Parliament 1890
Housing in the United Kingdom
Housing legislation in the United Kingdom